The 1966–67 Romanian Hockey League season was the 37th season of the Romanian Hockey League. Six teams participated in the league, and Steaua Bucuresti won the championship.

Regular season

External links
hochei.net

Rom
Romanian Hockey League seasons
1966–67 in Romanian ice hockey